Cóndor Sallani (possibly from Aymara kunturi condor, salla rocks, cliffs, -ni a suffix, "the one with condor cliffs") is a  mountain in the Vilcanota mountain range in the Andes of Peru. It is situated in the Cusco Region, Canchis Province, Checacupe District.

References 

Mountains of Cusco Region
Mountains of Peru